Parasemolea boliviana is a species of beetle in the family Cerambycidae, and the only species in the genus Parasemolea. It was described by Martins and Galileo in 1990.

References

Calliini
Beetles described in 1990
Monotypic beetle genera